Eugene Francis Loud (March 12, 1847 – December 19, 1908) was an American Civil War veteran who served six terms as a U.S. Representative from California from 1891 to 1903.

Early life and career 
Born in Abington, Massachusetts, Loud went to sea and afterward settled in California. During the Civil War, he enlisted in a California Cavalry battalion in 1862, which formed a part of the Second Regiment, Massachusetts Volunteer Cavalry.

He returned to California, where he engaged in mining and as clerk for fifteen years. He studied law, and served as a clerk in the customs service in San Francisco. He served as a member of the California State Assembly for the 43rd district from 1885 to 1887. He was cashier of the city and county of San Francisco.

Congress 
Loud was elected as a Republican to the Fifty-second and to the five succeeding Congresses (March 4, 1891 – March 3, 1903). He served as chairman of the Committee on the Post Office and Post Roads (Fifty-fourth through Fifty-seventh Congresses). In April 1898, Loud was among the six representatives who voted against declaring war on Spain. He was an unsuccessful candidate for reelection in 1902 to the Fifty-eighth Congress.

Death
He died in San Francisco, December 19, 1908. He remains were cremated and the ashes interred in the Odd Fellows Cemetery (which no longer exists). He was re-interred at Greenlawn Memorial Park, Colma.

References

1847 births
1908 deaths
Union Army soldiers
Republican Party members of the United States House of Representatives from California
Republican Party members of the California State Assembly
19th-century American politicians
Burials at Odd Fellows Cemetery (San Francisco, California)